Events from the year 1868 in art.

Events
 Rodolphe Julian establishes the Académie Julian in Paris.
 Deutsches Gewerbe-Museum zu Berlin established.
 English merchant Francis Cook, 1st Viscount of Monserrate, begins to add paintings to his art collection at Doughty House, Richmond, London.

Works

 Lawrence Alma-Tadema – Phidias Showing the Frieze of the Parthenon to his Friends
 Frédéric Bazille
 Self-portrait
 View of the Village
 Albert Bierstadt
 Among the Sierra Nevada, California
 In the Sierras
 Tyrolean Landscape
 Yosemite Valley, Yosemite Park (approximate date)
 Jean-Baptiste Carpeaux - Why Born Enslaved! or Why Born a Slave? - French Pourquoi! Naitre esclave? or La Negresse (first conceived)
 Léon-Alexandre Delhomme – Democritus meditating on the seat of the soul (sculpture)
 Lowes Cato Dickinson – Gladstone's Cabinet of 1886
 Lot Flannery – Abraham Lincoln (marble, Washington, D.C.)
 Jean-Léon Gérôme – The Execution of Marshal Ney
 George P. A. Healy – The Peacemakers
 Holman Hunt – Isabella and the Pot of Basil (large and small versions)
 Charles-Auguste Lebourg – The Child and the Grasshopper (marble)
 Édouard Manet
 The Balcony
 Luncheon in the Studio (Neue Pinakothek, Munich)
 Mme. Manet at the Piano (Musée d'Orsay, Paris)
 Portrait d’Émile Zola (Musée d’Orsay, Paris)
 Portrait of Théodore Duret (Musée du Petit Palais, Paris)
 John Everett Millais – Vanessa
 Claude Monet – On the Bank of the Seine, Bennecourt
 Albert Joseph Moore
 Azaleas
 A Greek Play (tempera panel for proscenium of Queen's Theatre, Long Acre, London)
 Elisabet Ney – King Ludwig II of Bavaria (sculpture)
 Vasily Perov – At the Railroad
 Val Prinsep – A Venetian Lover
 Pierre-Auguste Renoir
 In the Summer (The Bohemian girl)
 The Boy with the Cat
 Skaters in the Bois de Boulogne
 Dante Gabriel Rossetti
 The Blue Silk Dress (Walker Art Gallery (National Museums Liverpool))
 Lady Lilith (original version)
 Pia de' Tolomei
 Frederick Sandys – Medea
 James Tissot – Le Balcon du Cercle de la rue Royale
 Frederick Walker – The Vagrants

Births
 April 6 – Helen Hyde, American etcher and engraver (died 1919)
 April 12 – Ella Gaunt Smith, American doll-maker (died 1932)
 April 21 – Alfred Henry Maurer, American modernist painter (suicide 1932)
 April 28 – Émile Bernard, French Post-Impressionist painter (died 1941)
 June 5 – Johan Thorn Prikker, Dutch art nouveau painter and stained-glass artist (died 1932)
 June 18 – Georges Lacombe, French sculptor and painter (died 1916)
 October 8
 Fidus (Hugo Reinhold Karl Johann Höppener), German graphic designer (died 1948)
 Max Slevogt, German artist (died 1932)
 November 11 – Édouard Vuillard, French painter (died 1940)
 November 23 – Mary Brewster Hazelton, American portrait painter (died 1953)

Deaths
 January 15 – Lucie Ingemann, Danish religious painter (born 1792)
 January 28 – Adalbert Stifter, Austrian writer, poet, painter, and pedagogue (born 1805)
 February 14 – Emil Bærentzen, Danish portrait painter and lithographer (born 1799)
 February 21 – Giuseppe Abbati, Italian painter (born 1836)
 February 26 – Georg Heinrich Busse, German landscape painter and engraver (born 1810)
 March – John Burnet, Scottish engraver and painter (born 1781/1784)
 March 10 – Herman Wilhelm Bissen, Danish sculptor (born 1798)
 March 29 – Felix Slade, English lawyer, art collector and founder of the Slade School of Art (born 1788)
 May 2 – James Wilson Carmichael, English marine painter (born 1800)
 May 24 – Emanuel Leutze, German American painter (born 1816)
 August 10
 George Cattermole, English illustrator and watercolourist (born 1800)
 Adah Isaacs Menken, American actress, painter and poet (born 1835)
 September 13 – Richard Rothwell, Irish portrait and genre painter (born 1800)
 September 13 - Angélique Mezzara, French portrait painter and miniaturist (born 1793)
 September 27 – August Piepenhagen, German painter active in Bohemia (born 1791)
 October 10 – François-Édouard Picot, French historic painter (born 1786)
 November 23
 Claude Victor de Boissieu, French artist and local politician (born 1783)
 Charles Méryon, French etcher (born 1821)
 December 1 – John Edward Carew, Irish sculptor (born c. 1782)
 date unknown
 Johann Baptist Dallinger von Dalling, Austrian painter (born 1782)
 Louis Royer, Austrian Netherlands sculptor (born 1793)

References

 
Years of the 19th century in art
1860s in art